Yakh Mur may refer to:
 Yakh Mur, Baft
 Yakh Mur,, Rabor